Tom McKibbin (born 19 December 2002) is a Northern Irish professional golfer who currently plays on the European Tour. He grew up playing golf at Holywood Golf Club; the same home club as Rory McIlroy.

Amateur career
In January 2020, McKibbin made it to the final of the Australian Amateur at Royal Queensland. However, he was defeated 5 and 3 by Jediah Morgan.

Professional career
McKibbin turned professional in April 2021 at the age of 18. He made his professional debut at the Tenerife Open on the European Tour where he missed the cut.

McKibbin played on the Challenge Tour in 2022. He was in contention to win at the Bain's Whisky Cape Town Open in February. A final-round 73 saw him miss out and finish tied-for-third. He also finished solo second at the Irish Challenge at the K Club in July. In November, at the Rolex Challenge Tour Grand Final, McKibbin shot a final-round 66 to finish tied-sixth and lift him to 10th place in the Challenge Tour Rankings, ultimately gaining a card for the 2023 European Tour season.

In February 2023, McKibbin held the 36-hole lead at the Singapore Classic on the European Tour.

Amateur wins
2018 Major Champions Invitational

Source:

Team appearances
European Boys' Team Championship (representing Ireland): 2018, 2019
Jacques Léglise Trophy (representing Great Britain & Ireland): 2018 (winners), 2019

See also
2022 Challenge Tour graduates

References

External links

Male golfers from Northern Ireland
European Tour golfers
2002 births
Living people